Frozen River is a lost 1929 part-talkie film directed by F. Harmon Weight and starring silent film canine star Rin Tin Tin and boy actor Davey Lee. Warner Bros. produced and distributed the film releasing it with sound recorded in the Vitaphone process.

Cast
Rin Tin Tin as Lobo, a dog
Davey Lee as Billy
Raymond McKee as Jerry
Nina Quartero as Jane
Josef Swickard as Hazy
Frank Campeau as Potter
Lew Harvey as Pierre

Reception
According to Warner Bros records the film earned $241,000 domestically and $77,000 foreign.

Preservation status
This is a lost film. It was recorded using the Vitaphone sound on disc process.

According to the WildCat.org website, UCLA Film and Television Archive has a copy of the film.

References

External links

Google Images lobby poster page

1929 films
American silent feature films
Lost American films
Warner Bros. films
American black-and-white films
Films scored by Louis Silvers
Films directed by F. Harmon Weight
Rin Tin Tin
Films with screenplays by Harry Behn
1920s American films